Dr. Kingsley Nyarko is a Ghanaian politician and a member of parliament for Kwadaso constituency within Ashanti Region of Ghana. He is also the secretary of the National Accreditation Board (NAB) of Ghana. He is a member of the New Patriotic Party.

Early life and education 
Nyarko was born on 10 June 1973 and hails from Obo Kwahu in the Eastern Region of Ghana. He had his Common entrance in 1986, his Ordinary level in 1992, his Advance level in 1997 and his Teacher Certificate in 1995. He further had his Bachelors in Education in Psychology in 2000, his Masters in Educational psychology/ Differential psychology in 2005 and his Ph D in Educational psychology in 2008.

Career 
Nyarko was the headmaster for the Mile 18 Junior High School. He was also a tutor at the Ejisuman Senior High School. He also was the African Representative and Marketing specialist for Voicecash. He was also the Executive Director for the Danquah Institute. He was a Senior Lecturer at the University of Ghana. He was also the Executive Secretary for the National Accreditation Board.

Political career 
Nyarko is a member of the 8th parliament of the 4th republic of Ghana representing the Kwadaso Constituency. His political career began in 2020 when he contested in the 2020 Ghanaian general elections on the ticket of the New Patriotic Party. He was elected as member of parliament for the Kwadaso constituency in the 2020 December parliamentary elections. He won the seat after getting 61,772 votes making 87.51% of the total votes cast.

Committees 
Nyarko is member of the Poverty Reduction Strategy Committee and also the member of the Education Committee.

Personal life 
Nyarko is a Christian.

Philanthropy 
In October 2021, Nyarko donated about 1,000 pieces of school uniforms to Nwamase M/A, Denkyemuoso M/A, Asuoyeboah M/A, Kwadaso M/A, Beposo M/A Block A, and B, Prempeh Experimental M/A Block A, B, and C and also Central Agric Station Primary in the Kwadaso Constituency.

References 

New Patriotic Party politicians
Ghanaian Christians
Living people
Ghanaian MPs 2021–2025
People from Ashanti Region
1973 births